In chemistry, dynamic equilibrium refers to a reversible reaction which has achieved a steady state.

In economics, dynamic equilibrium may refer to:

 Economic equilibrium#Dynamic equilibrium
 Intertemporal equilibrium
 Recursive competitive equilibrium